Las Leyendas Nunca Mueren is the third solo studio album, and fourth overall, by Puerto Rican rapper Anuel AA. It was released on November 26, 2021, through Real Hasta la Muerte and Sony Music Latin. The album follows his second studio album Emmanuel (2020), and his collaboration album with Ozuna, Los Dioses (2021).

The album features collaborations with Eladio Carrión, Mora, Myke Towers and Jhayco.

Background 
In August 2020, Anuel AA uploaded a preview of a song, called "300" and wrote: "I will make an album for the trap, should I?".

Anuel AA announced his upcoming album in May 2021 in an Instagram live. His manager Frabián Elí confirmed that the album would be released in July and will include trap and only two reggaeton songs. Later he announced via Instagram that the album had been delayed.
 
The title was revealed in August 2021 when Anuel uploaded an Instagram post with the name of his next album. The photo was from the official video of the song "23 Preguntas".

In September 2021, Anuel uploaded a freestyle preview on Instagram, claiming that the album was finished. The unreleased track samples "Ready or Not" by the Fugees.

On November 18, 2021, Anuel AA announced the track listing for the album via the final basketball game between Capitanes de Arecibo and Mets de Guaynabo. The names and numbers of the tracks were on the warm-up shirts of the Capitanes team.

Singles 
Anuel AA released the first two singles of the album, "Dictadura" on October 28, 2021 and "Leyenda" on November 12, 2021. Puerto Rican rappers Myke Towers and Jhayco featured on the third single of the album, "Súbelo".

Track listing 

Notes
 "Real Hasta la Muerte" contains samples of "Hello Zepp" and "Zepp Overture" performed by Charlie Clouser
 "McGregor" contains samples of "Drive Forever" performed by Sergio Valentino
 "Última Canción" contains samples of "Ready or Not" performed by the Fugees and "Boadicea" performed by Enya

Charts

Weekly charts

Year-end charts

References 

2021 albums
Anuel AA albums